The Torrens Trophy is awarded to an individual or organisation for demonstrating "Outstanding Contribution to the Cause or Technical Excellence of Safe and Skilful Motorcycling in the UK". It is named in honour of The Motor Cycle editor and Royal Automobile Club (RAC) vice-president Arthur Bourne, who wrote a column under the pen name Torrens. The RAC established the trophy to recognise "outstanding contributions to motor cycle safety" before extending its purpose to include individuals considered to be "the finest motor cyclists". The trophy, an eight-pint silver tankard, has been awarded infrequently since 1979 by the Torrens Trophy Nominations Committee, which is composed of a panel of experts; it is only presented if, in the opinion of the RAC, the achievement can be justified to deserve the award. The winner is honoured at a ceremony at the RAC's Pall Mall clubhouse and headquarters in London.

The inaugural recipient was Frederick Lovegrove in 1979. It has been awarded to two organisations in its history, the Transport and Road Laboratory in 1980 for promoting safer motorcycle braking systems, and the German automotive marque BMW nine years later for the development of its anti-lock braking system for its production motorcycles. Emma Bristow was the first woman motor cyclist to be awarded the accolade when she was named the 2020 recipient. Since its establishment, the award has not been presented during five periods in history: from 1982 to 1988, between 1990 to 1997, from 1999 to 2007, between 2009 and 2012. , the accolade has been won fifteen times: Superbike riders have won it four times, with road motorbike racers recognised twice, and Grand Prix motorcycle riders and motorcycle speedway competitors honoured once. The 2021 winner is Cresent Yamaha for winning each of the riders, teams and manufacturers championships in the 2021 Superbike World Championship.

Recipients

Notes

References

Auto racing trophies and awards
Awards established in 1979